The Royal Albert Edward Infirmary, also known as the Wigan Infirmary, is a health facility in Wigan Lane, Wigan, Greater Manchester, England. It is managed by the Wrightington, Wigan and Leigh NHS Foundation Trust.

History
The facility has its origins in the Wigan Dispensary which was established in King Street in 1796. The foundation stone for the current facility in Wigan Lane was laid by the Earl of Crawford in 1870. General Sir James Lindsay, who had seen action in the Red River Rebellion, was in attendance for the ceremony. The new building, which was designed by Thomas Worthington and Joseph Hanson, was opened by the Prince and Princess of Wales in 1873. A children's ward was added in 1877 and it joined the National Health Service in 1948. A major extension, in the same architectural style as the original building, was completed in 2004. In September 2019 the trust announced that an extra ward might be created to respond to growing demand for beds.

In May 2020, a new ward dedicated to treating COVID-19 patients was opened in the hospital. The Bryn Ward has 50 beds with 27 of those being used for intensive care. The modular unit was built in the Infirmary's car park.

In 2021, a new £7.6 million community assessment unit, with 21 beds, was opened in the Infirmary.

References

External links
Official site

Hospitals established in 1796
1796 establishments in England
Hospitals in Greater Manchester
NHS hospitals in England
Buildings and structures in Wigan